Art director is the title for a variety of similar job functions in theater, advertising, marketing, publishing, fashion, film and television, the Internet, and video games.

It is the charge of a sole art director to supervise and unify the vision of an artistic production. In particular, they are in charge of its overall visual appearance and how it communicates visually, stimulates moods, contrasts features, and psychologically appeals to a target audience. The art director makes decisions about visual elements, what artistic style(s) to use, and when to use motion.

One of the biggest challenges art directors face is translating desired moods, messages, concepts, and underdeveloped ideas into imagery. In the brainstorming process, art directors, colleagues and clients explore ways the finished piece or scene could look. At times, the art director is responsible for solidifying the vision of the collective imagination while resolving conflicting agendas and inconsistencies between contributors' ideas.

In advertising
Despite the title, an advertising art director is not necessarily the head of an art department. In modern advertising practice, an art director typically works with a copywriter as a creative team. In advertising, an art director makes sure the client's message is conveyed to their desired audience. They are responsible for the advertising's visual aspects, while working with other team members such as the graphic designer. They work together to devise an overall concept (also known as the "creative" or "big idea") for the commercial, mailer, brochure, or other advertisements. The copywriter is responsible for the textual content, and the art director for the visual aspects. But the art director may come up with the headline or other copy, and the copywriter may suggest a visual or aesthetic approach. Each usually welcomes suggestions and constructive criticism from the other, as such collaboration often improves the work.

Although a good art director is expected to have graphic design judgment and technical knowledge of production, it may not be necessary for an art director to hand-render comprehensive layouts, or even be able to draw, now that virtually all but the most preliminary work is done on computer.

Except in the smallest organizations, the art director/copywriter team is overseen by a creative director, senior media creative or chief creative director. In a large organization, an art director may oversee other art directors and a team of junior designers, image developers and/or production artists, and coordinate with a separate production department. In a smaller organization, the art director may fill all these roles, including overseeing printing and other production.

In film
An art director, in the hierarchical structure of a film art department, works directly below the production designer, in collaboration with the set decorator and the set designers. A large part of their duties include the administrative aspects of the art department. They are responsible for assigning tasks to personnel such as the art department coordinator and the construction coordinator, keeping track of the art department budget and scheduling, and overall quality control. They are often also a liaison to other departments, especially construction, special effects, property, transportation (graphics), and locations departments. The art director also attends all production meetings and tech scouts in order to provide information to the set designers in preparation for all departments to have a visual floor plan of each location visited.

The term "art director" was first used in 1914 by Wilfred Buckland when this title was used to denote the head of the art department (hence the Academy Award for Best Art Direction), which also included the set decorator. Now the award includes the production designer and set decorator. On the movie Gone with the Wind, David O. Selznick felt that William Cameron Menzies had such a significant role in the look of the film that the title art director was not sufficient, and so he gave Menzies the title of production designer. This title is now commonly used as the title for the head of the art department, although the title actually implies control over every visual aspect of a film, including costumes.

On films with smaller art departments, such as small independent films and short films, the terms "production designer" and "art director" are often synonymous, and the person taking on the role may be credited as either.

In publishing
Art directors in publishing typically work with the publication's editors. Together, they work on a concept for sections and pages of a publication. Individually, the art director is mostly responsible for the visual look and feel of the publication, and the editor has ultimate responsibility for the publication's verbal and textual contents.

See also
 VFX creative director
 Scenography

References

External links
 ADG Art Direction Wiki Online community and knowledge base relating to new and classic technologies relevant to the art of film design

 
Advertising occupations
Filmmaking occupations
Theatrical occupations
Theatrical management
Computer occupations